(The Master and Margarita) is an opera in two acts by York Höller. The libretto, also by Höller, is based on  Mikhail Bulgakov's novel, The Master and Margarita. Höller composed the work between 1984 and 1989, and revised it in 2008.

 was premiered at the Paris Opéra (Palais Garnier) on 20 May 1989, staged by Hans Neuenfels and conducted by Lothar Zagrosek, with Roland Herrmann and Karan Armstrong in the title roles. It was recorded in 2000 by the Gürzenich Orchestra Cologne, again conducted by Zagrosek, with Richard Salter, Marilyn Schmiege and Franz Mazura in leading roles.

Roles

References

External links 
 Der Meister und Margarita comes home The Opera Critic, September 2013
 Der Meister und Margarita - Hamburgische Staatsoper Opera Online
Der Meister und Margarita on masterandmargarita.eu, a website devoted to Mikhail Bulgakov's novel and its many adaptations

1989 operas
German-language operas
Operas based on novels
Operas